Fariz Rustam Munaf or better known as Fariz RM (born in Jakarta, Indonesia on 5 January 1959) is an Indonesian singer-songwriter and multi-instrumentalist of mixed ethnic Betawi, Dutch and Minangkabau descent. He is the uncle of Indonesian singer-songwriter, Sherina Munaf.

Biography
Fariz Rustam Munaf was born on 5 January 1959, in Jakarta. His mother, Anna Reijnenberg, was a piano teacher of Dutch-Betawi descent. He began studying music at age five, beginning with classical piano and later studying the blues.

Beginning his career in 1977, he has released 19 solo albums and three with other artists. He is best known for his songs "Barcelona" and "Sakura" (Cherry Blossom). Three of his solo songs were listed in Rolling Stone Indonesia 2009 list "The 150 Best Indonesian Songs of All Time", with another of his compositions also listed.

In 1977, Fariz joined the Prambors FM Song Writing Contest for adolescents, finishing in the top ten. That same year, he played the drums on the album Badai Pasti Berlalu; it was during this time that Chrisye gave him the nickname Fariz RM, which Fariz continued to use as a stage name because "Chrisye thought it sounded nice."

In 1979, Fariz released his first album Selangkah ke Seberang. The following year, Fariz released Sakura – Japanese word for Cherry blossom, which made him famous. During the 1980s, Fariz was a "poster boy" often featured in magazines for teenagers.

In 2001 Fariz was among prominent individuals summoned by the Jakarta Police and questioned for their alleged links to Aceh Referendum Information Center (SIRA) and questioned in relation to the bombing of an Acehnese dormitory in Setiabudi in May of that year. Based on documents seized, Police suspected that he had aided the perpetrators based on a letter he had sent to Tengku Abdullah Syafiie, leader of the Free Aceh Movement, expressing sympathy and support for the group's separatist cause. After Fariz was released, he mentioned that he had received a large amount of support from reporters. Fariz also expressed concern for Acehnese refugees, to whom he was prepared to donate some proceeds of record sales.

Fariz was arrested for marijuana possession in 2007; he was sentenced to eight months in prison and rehab.

In 2009, Fariz wrote and published Living in Harmony, a book on his life and influences, with Budianto Shambazy and Salomo Simanungkalit as editors. It outlined 60 events in his life and how they influenced him.

During his career, Fariz has been a member of numerous bands, including WOW, Jakarta Rhythm Section, Symphony, Transs, Rollies, and Giant Steps. His influences include The Beatles, Pink Floyd, The Police, Marvin Gaye, and Claude Debussy. The Jakarta Post considers his music "... a spectrum of styles and sounds not immediately apparent, except to discriminating ears..."

Personal life
Fariz is married to Oneng. Together they have three children and his niece is the Indonesian singer and actress Sherina Munaf. He enjoys reading and has stated that he prefers small concerts, feeling "ashamed" when one of his concerts caused road congestion.

Awards
 1989 BASF Awards for BARCELONA
In 2009, Rolling Stone Indonesia listed 3 of Fariz's solo songs as the best Indonesian songs of all time, with "Sakura" placing 9th, "Barcelona" 23rd, and "Selangkah ke Seberang" 121st. Another of Fariz's compositions, "Hasrat dan Cinta" (Desire and Love), covered by Andi Meriem Matalatta, placed 103rd. and "Interlokal" which Fariz played with his band Symphony in 94th.

Discography
Source:
Chr Nast (FRM Private Library – 08129083267)
Rolling Stone Indonesia

Solo albums
 1979 – Selangkah ke Seberang (A Step Across)
 1980 – Sakura (Cherry Blossom)
 1981 – Panggung Perak (The Silver Stage)
 1982 – Peristiwa 77–81 (The 77–81 Incident)
 1983 – Fariz & Mustaka
 1984 – Peristiwa 81–84 (The 81–84 Incident)
 1985 – Musik Rasta (Rasta Music)
 1987 – Do Not Erase
 1988 – Living in Western World
 1989 – Fariz Hitz
 1989 – Fashionova
 1990 – Cover Ten
 1992 – Balada (Ballad)
 1993 – Romantic
 1996 – Dongeng Negeri Cinta (Fable from the Land of Love)
 1997 – Super Medley
 1998 – Kronologi (Chronology)
 2001 – Dua Dekade (Two Decades)
 2002 – Mix!
 2006 – Curse on Cozmic Avenue
 2012 – Fenomena

With other bands

Transs
 1981 – Hotel San Vicente
 1981 – Tembang Remaja

Symphony
 1982 – Trapesium
 1983 – Metal
 1987 – N.O.R.M.A.L

Jakarta Rhythm Section
 1981 – Jakarta Rhythm Section
 1983 – Pesona Rindu
 1984 – Reinkarnasi
 1990 – Aku Harus Pergi (Singles Collection)

Fariz RM Group
 1996 – Revolusi Hiu, Ular dan Cendrawasih

Superdigi
 1987 – Living in Western World (Fariz RM)
 1988 – Malam Dansa (Nourma Yunita)
 1989 – Kencan (Single – Indonesia's Top Ten)

Wow!
 1983 – Produk Hijau ( Green Product)
 1990 – Rasio & Misteri(Ratio and Misery)
 1991 – Lupus IV (Original Soundtrack Lupus IV)

Duet albums
 1991 – Gala Premiere (w/ Jacob Kembar)
 1992 – Asean Skies (w/ Janet Arnaiz)
 1993 – Tabu (w/ Renny Djajoesman; Taboo)

References
Footnotes

Bibliography
 
 

1959 births
Living people
People from Jakarta
Indonesian songwriters
20th-century Indonesian male singers
21st-century Indonesian male singers
Indonesian people of Dutch descent
Indo people
Minangkabau people
Betawi people